shalan joudry is a Mi'kmaw writer, storyteller, and ecologist. She is known for her poetry collections, including the multi-award nominated Waking Ground.

Career 
Joudry's first book, a collection of poems titled, Generations Re-merging, was published by Gaspereau Press in 2014. Her poetry had previously appeared in "The Nashwaak Review" and "Mi'kmaq Anthology II". In August 2018, joudry's play Elapultiek premiered with Two Planks and a Passion Theatre in Kings County, Nova Scotia at the Ross Creek Centre for the Arts. Joudry played Nat opposite Matthew Lumley's Bill. The production subsequently toured four Indigenous communities in Nova Scotia. A second tour was carried out in the fall of 2019.

Joudry managed programs for species at risk and ecology for more than ten years. Joudry's artistic work often weaves in ecological and Indigenous teachings.

Her second published poetry collection was Waking Ground, which was released in 2020 also by Gaspereau Press. In 2021, it was selected by the Writers' Trust of Canada as one of 25 books for the WT Amplified Voices program, which aims to amplify BIPOC voices in Canadian writing and promote works of BIPOC writers created during the COVID-19 pandemic.

Works

Poetry 

 Generations Re-merging (Gaspereau Press, 2014)
 Waking Ground (Gaspereau Press, 2020)

Plays 

 Elapultiek (We Are Looking Towards) (Pottersfield Press, 2019)
 Mi'kmaq Stories: Past and Present (2020, co-created with Catherine Martin and Trevor Gould)
 Koqm (2021)

Awards

Personal life 
Joudry is from L’sɨtkuk (Bear River First Nation). She has one daughter and one son, one of which is named Malaika Joudry-Martel. She lives in Kespukwitk (southwest Nova Scotia) with her partner Frank Meuse.

Notes

References 

Canadian women dramatists and playwrights
Canadian women poets
21st-century Canadian poets
Mi'kmaq people
1979 births
Living people